Michael Stadther is an author best known for his book A Treasure's Trove: A Fairy Tale about Real Treasure for Parents and Children of All Ages. Treasure Trove, Inc. was incorporated to distribute the book. A sequel to A Treasure's Trove, called Secrets of the Alchemist Dar was released in September, 2006. After the success of A Treasure's Trove, other ventures including robotic editing were started to help self-published authors.  Treasure Trove, Inc. was put into bankruptcy in 2007 in a dispute with its distributor, Simon and Schuster. Stadther lived in Pound Ridge, New York with his wife of 25 years, Helen Demetrios at the time the two books were published.

References

External links
 former Biography page at author's defunct company site: http://www.atreasurestrove.com/Public/News-Updates/BiographyMichaelStadther/index.cfm
 defunct book site: http://www.alchemistdar.com
 Biography page at Simon And Schuster
 Book Video for Secrets of the Alchemist Dar

American children's writers
Living people
Year of birth missing (living people)
People from Pound Ridge, New York